Cedar Creek or Cedarcreek is an unincorporated community in Taney County, Missouri, United States. It is located approximately fifteen miles southeast of Branson at the intersection of Missouri Supplemental Routes M and KK. The stream Cedar Creek lies about three miles north on route M. The community is part of the Branson, Missouri Micropolitan Statistical Area.

A post office called Cedar Creek was established in 1871, and the name was changed to Cedarcreek in 1894. The community takes its name from nearby Cedar Creek.

References

Unincorporated communities in Taney County, Missouri
Branson, Missouri micropolitan area
Unincorporated communities in Missouri